The 1500 metres at the 2006 Commonwealth Games as part of the athletics programme were held at the Melbourne Cricket Ground on Friday 24 March 2006 and Saturday 25 March 2006.

The top four runners in each of the two heats automatically qualified for the final. The next four fastest runners from across the heats also qualified. Those 12 runners competed in the final.

Records

Medals

Qualification

Going into the event, the top ten Commonwealth athletes as ranked by the International Association of Athletics Federations were:

 Craig Mottram's 9th in this event took him from outside the top 100 to 17th in the world, and to seventh in the Commonwealth.
 Nick Willis' gold in this event took him from 28th to 21st in the world, and from 12th to ninth in the Commonwealth.
 Mark Fountain's bronze in this event took him from equal 37th to 25th in the world, and from 15th to 12th in the Commonwealth.
 Nathan Brannen's silver in this event took him from 31st to equal 26th in the world, and from outright 13th to equal 13th in the Commonwealth.

Results
All times shown are in minutes.
 Q denotes qualification by place in heat.
 q denotes qualification by overall place.
 DNS denotes did not start.
 DNF denotes did not finish.
 DQ denotes disqualification.
 NR denotes national record.
 GR denotes Games record.
 WR denotes world record.
 PB denotes personal best.
 SB denotes season best.

Heats

Final

References
Results

1500
2006